Stage to Thunder Rock is a 1964 American Western film directed by William F. Claxton, written by Charles A. Wallace, and featuring Barry Sullivan, Marilyn Maxwell, Scott Brady, Lon Chaney Jr., Keenan Wynn, Anne Seymour, John Agar, Wanda Hendrix and Ralph Taeger. The picture was released on November 10, 1964, by Paramount Pictures.

Plot
In his last act before retirement, Horne, a western sheriff, tracks down the Sawyer brothers, who have robbed a bank of $50,000. He kills one and apprehends the other. Ross Sawyer, a wanted outlaw and father of the boys, intends to intercept the stagecoach before Horne can bring his son Reese to justice.

Leah Parker returns to her family, who run the stagecoach depot. The Parkers are in dire need of money and hope Leah can help, although her reputation as a lady is in question. Without her daughter's knowledge, Myra Parker accepts a bribe to help the Sawyers defeat the sheriff.

Also in need of money to help his blind daughter, Sam Swope is deputized by the town and goes after Ross Sawyer, but is shot. Horne shoots it out with Ross and prevails, then turns in his badge and plans to settle down with Leah.

Cast 

Barry Sullivan as Sheriff Horne
Marilyn Maxwell as Leah Parker
Scott Brady as Sam Swope
Lon Chaney Jr. as Henry Parker 
Anne Seymour as Myra Parker
John Agar as Dan Carrouthers
Wanda Hendrix as Mrs. Sarah Swope
Ralph Taeger as Reese Sawyer
Keenan Wynn as Ross Sawyer
Allan Jones as Mayor Ted Dollar
Laurel Goodwin as Julie Parker
Robert Strauss as Bob Acres
Robert Lowery as Deputy Sheriff Seth Barrington
Rex Bell Jr. as 'Shotgun' Rex
Argentina Brunetti as Sarita
Morgan Brittany as Sandy (credited as Suzanne Cupito)
Paul E. Burns as Joe Withers
Wayne Peters as Toby Sawyer
Roy Jenson as Harkins

See also
List of American films of 1964

References

External links 
 

1964 films
1960s English-language films
Paramount Pictures films
American Western (genre) films
1964 Western (genre) films
Films scored by Paul Dunlap
Films directed by William F. Claxton
1960s American films